Little Red Riding Hood is a 1920 Czechoslovak drama film directed by Svatopluk Innemann.

Cast
Ludmila Innemannová as Grandmother 
Zdena Kavková as Karkulka Podhorská 
Josef Zora as Father 
Arnošta Záhoříková as Mother 
František Beranský as Jirka 
Josef Rovenský as Wizard
Karel Noll as Night watch Vrána 
Eman Fiala as Cobbler Smůla 
Karel Hruška as Tailor Nitka 
Antonín Frič as Reeve 
Jan W. Speerger as Forester Dubský

References

External links 
 
 

1920 films
1920s Czech-language films
1920 drama films
Czechoslovak black-and-white films
Films based on Little Red Riding Hood
Czech silent films
Czech black-and-white films
Czechoslovak drama films
Silent drama films